Enonchong is a surname. Notable people with the surname include:

Henry Ndifor Abi Enonchong (1934–2008), Cameroonian barrister
Rebecca Enonchong (born 1967), Cameroonian technology entrepreneur, daughter of Henry

Surnames of African origin